Heliothrips is a genus of thrips in the family Thripidae. There are about 18 described species in Heliothrips.

Species
These 18 species belong to the genus Heliothrips:

 Heliothrips braziliensis Morgan
 Heliothrips bromi Moulton, 1927
 Heliothrips bruneri Morgan
 Heliothrips brunneipennis Bagnall
 Heliothrips cinctipennis (Hood)
 Heliothrips crestri Pergande
 Heliothrips globiceps Karny, 1913
 Heliothrips gossypii Moulton, 1927
 Heliothrips haemorrhoidalis (Bouché, 1833) (greenhouse thrips)
 Heliothrips impurus Priesner, 1927
 Heliothrips indicus Bagnall
 Heliothrips margipennis
 Heliothrips pattersoni (Bagnall)
 Heliothrips phaseoli (Hood)
 Heliothrips similis
 Heliothrips striatopterus (Kobur)
 Heliothrips zucchi Mound & Monteiro
 † Heliothrips scudderi Bagnall, 1924

References

Further reading

 
 
 
 
 
 

Thripidae
Articles created by Qbugbot